Bratu is a Romanian surname that may refer to:

 Aurel Bratu
 Cristian Bratu
 Doru Bratu
 Emilian Bratu
 Florin Bratu
 Ilie Bratu
 Traian Bratu

See also 
 Bratu River
 Bratu 220, a Franco-Romanian prototype three-engined airliner of the 1930s, built in France
 Bratia (disambiguation)
 Brăteni (disambiguation)
 Brătești (disambiguation)
 Brateș, the name of two villages in Romania
 Brateiu, a commune in Romania

Family names:
 Brătianu family
 Brătescu — search for "Brătescu"

Romanian-language surnames